"Everything You Wanted" is a song by Kele Okereke, lead singer and rhythm guitarist of the band Bloc Party. It was released as the second single from his solo album The Boxer.

Music video
The song's music video was released on July 21, 2010 to Kele's official YouTube channel. As of September 30, 2018, the video has 1,218,252 views.
The video was filmed in New York.

Track listings

References

2010 singles
2010 songs
Kele Okereke songs
Songs written by Kele Okereke
Wichita Recordings singles